Jelenin svet (Jelena's World) is a 2008 independent documentary film written and directed by Tanja Brzaković, about former World No. 1 female tennis player, Jelena Janković.

Background
The film follows Jelena Janković over a 14-month period, and includes tennis tournaments in Madrid and Berlin, as well as her visits to her home in Belgrade.

At the beginning of the documentary, Janković was ranked as third best tennis player in the world.  The film follows her regime as she prepares for various meets, deals with maintaining her diet, trains, meets with fans, and begins her matches.

Cast
 Jelena Janković as herself
 Snežana Janković as herself (Jelena's mother)
 Ricardo Sánchez as himself (Jelena's coach)
In tennis matches:
 Anna Chakvetadze
 Elena Dementieva
 Justine Henin
 Ana Ivanovic
 Svetlana Kuznetsova

Reception
When the film premiered in Belgrade on November 12, 2008, it outsold the James Bond film Quantum of Solace which opened there that same weekend, bumping the Bond film to second place in the Serbian box office.

In speaking about the film, Politika made note that full-length theatrically released documentary films about Serbian athletes are rare. They appreciated that Jelenin svet celebrated the efforts of one of the best among the best in the world, and that the film was able to document Jelena Janković's rise from third-best to world's best. They wrote that the film is dynamic, witty and cheerful in its portrait of Janković, and that it allows viewers to better understand the subject of the film.

References

External links
 
 
 „Јеленин свет” - Ведрина на трону, Politika, November 14, 2008

2008 films
German documentary films
Serbian documentary films
2000s Serbian-language films
Films set in Belgrade
Documentary films about sportspeople
2008 documentary films
Tennis films
Cultural depictions of Serbian women
Cultural depictions of Jelena Janković
Cultural depictions of Ana Ivanovic
Films shot in Belgrade
2000s English-language films
2000s German films